The 2007–08 Belarusian Extraliga season was the 16th season of the Belarusian Extraliga, the top level of ice hockey in Belarus. 10 teams participated in the league, and HK Keramin Minsk won the championship.

Regular season

Playoffs
Quarterfinals
HK Keramin Minsk - HK Neman Grodno 3-0 on series
HK Vitebsk - Metallurg Zhlobin 3-2 on series
HK Yunost Minsk - Khimik SKA-Novopolotsk 3-1 on series
HC Dinamo Minsk - HK Khimvolokno Mogilev 3-2 on series
Semifinals
HK Keramin Minsk - HK Vitebsk 3-0 on series
HK Yunost Minsk - HC Dinamo Minsk 3-0 on series
Final
HK Keramin Minsk - HK Yunost Minsk 4-0 on series

External links 
 Season on hockeyarchives.info

Belarusian Extraleague
Belarusian Extraleague seasons
Extra